The murder of Helen Gorrie (1976 or 1977 – 31 July/1 August 1992) was a high-profile child murder which occurred in the grounds of Merchistoun Hall in Horndean, Hampshire in 1992. 15-year-old Gorrie was found half-naked and strangled in the spot popular with courting couples only ten minutes from her home, after going out one night to meet a 21-year-old man named John Corcoran. She had met him the night before as he cruised around the area in his vehicle, and he had asked her to meet up with him that night. The murder of the schoolgirl made headline news at the time and featured on Crimewatch. Cocoran was suspected of strangling Gorrie after she refused his sexual advances, and in 1999 he was convicted of her murder. In 2003 Corcoran was released on appeal after only serving around three years. The police revealed that there were no grounds to re-open the investigation, although the case remains officially unsolved.

Murder

Gorrie was described as a sociable girl with lots of friends who liked being out and about. She lived on an estate in Horndean, Hampshire, with her mum Sheila and stepbrother Jamie. Her mother said that she was well-liked and did not have "an enemy in the world". On the night she died, Friday 31 July 1992, she spent the later part of the evening at home with her brother. At 11:30 pm, Helen said she was going to bed, before coming back downstairs shortly after and leaving the house, telling her brother that she would only be a few minutes and wouldn't be long. As she had been getting ready for bed she had gone out with her all-in-one nightdress beneath her clothing. It wasn't unusual for Helen to go out that late, as a lot of her friends lived nearby and sometimes they called for her, or she might occasionally see a friend she knew out of an upstairs window and gone out to meet them. She was normally home by about 1:00 am.

The following morning, Gorrie was found dead in the grounds of Merchistoun Hall, the Horndean Community Centre, only 10 minutes' walk from her house. She was found left on a footpath by wedding guests using the facility. She had been strangled with her own clothing and police believed she may have died around 12:30 am. She was half-naked, indicating the murder was sexually motivated, although there was no evidence of sexual assault.

Gorrie's murder made headline news nationally. At an emotional news conference, Gorrie's mother broke down as she described how her daughter was "a lovable girl with a zest for life".

Several witnesses came forward to report seeing a girl matching Gorrie's description near to Merchistoun Hall that evening. Two independent witnesses had reported seeing a girl who looked to be Gorrie waiting at a bus stop by the Portsmouth Road, at the junction with Catherington Lane, and getting into a car that may have been a Ford Escort which had come up from Catherington Lane.

At around midnight, a woman driving along Portsmouth Road saw a man come out of the bushes on the side of the road, and he appeared to not want to have his face seen by the driver. At 12:30 am, a man driving down the same stretch of road saw two men standing several yards apart, but the driver got the impression that they were together. He said that one of the men looked suspicious and seemed to be worried that someone had spotted them. Police believe it may have been around this time that Helen was killed.

Gorrie's case was featured on the heavily watched Crimewatch programme three months after her murder in October, where it was also revealed that an unidentified man who had gone in to the One Stop supermarket on Catherington Lane on 3 August telling the cashier that he had seen Gorrie on the road at around 12:30 am that night (the time police believed she may have been killed). When the cashier asked if he had told the police this information, he began acting strangely and left quickly, saying he hadn't, with the cashier commenting "all he really wanted to do was to get away from me".

John Corcoran
A few days after Gorrie's murder, unemployed 21-year-old John Corcoran of Warren Park, Havant, was questioned about the murder. His "business card" had been found in Helen's bedroom, and he had scratches on his arm. Helen had met Corcoran the night before she died, as he had cruised the streets of Hordean in his battered Ford Escort car. It was discovered that Gorrie had written in her diary before she had left on the night she died, saying:

On the night Gorrie went out, Corcoran had again been driving aimlessly around Horndean with his friends. His friends said that he left them for 40 minutes, saying he had to meet someone. He was said to "prey on young girls" and police believed he had tried to force himself on Gorrie, and when she resisted he strangled and smothered her with her own clothing.

Trial 
Corcoran was tried and found guilty of Gorrie's murder in December 1999. It was heard that the scratches on his arm had come from Helen as she fought him for her life, as supported by the fact that two of her false fingernails were found at the scene. Sentencing, the judge told him:

Corcoran was sentenced to life imprisonment. Lead detective Colin Smith reacted by saying: "Helen was a popular, lively but vulnerable adolescent who was killed by a nasty and vicious man who preyed on young girls."

Conviction overturned
In January 2003, Corcoran had his conviction for the murder overturned on appeal. The grounds were that the judge had misdirected the jury in his summing up. After he was released Corcoran moved back to his home in Plumley Walk, Warren Park, Havant.

Later publicity
In 2018, on journalist Mark Williams-Thomas's documentary show The Investigator: A British Crime Story, Gorrie's case was included on a list of cases that he felt could not be ruled out as possible victims of serial killer Peter Tobin. However, a large police investigation named Operation Anagram examined the possibility of Tobin having claimed more victims and ended in 2011, having found no evidence to connect him to any further cases.

In popular culture
Gorrie's murder featured as the primary case on the 15 October 1992 episode of Crimewatch on BBC One.

See also
List of miscarriages of justice in the United Kingdom
Double jeopardy in the UK post-2003
Ernest Barrie – British man released on appeal after a Rough Justice campaign, only to go on to kill a man 
Michael Weir – UK man re-convicted of a 1999 murder in 2019 after also previously being released on appeal on a technicality
Simon Hall – UK murderer who maintained his innocence and was helped by 'miscarriage of justice' campaigners, only to go on to confess to the crime
Murder of Patsy Morris
Stephen Downing case
Murder of Alison Shaughnessy

References

1990s trials
2003 in England
1999 in England
1992 in England
1992 murders in the United Kingdom
2000s in England
1992 in British law
1999 in British law
2003 in British law
Female murder victims
Murder in England
Crime in Portsmouth
People acquitted of murder
People convicted of murder by England and Wales
People wrongfully convicted of murder
People from Havant
People from Portsmouth
Havant
English prisoners sentenced to life imprisonment
Overturned convictions in England
Overturned convictions in the United Kingdom
Court of Appeal (England and Wales) cases
Unsolved murders in England
Portsmouth
Deaths by person in England
July 1992 events in the United Kingdom
August 1992 events in the United Kingdom
January 2003 events in the United Kingdom
Missing person cases in England
Murder trials
Hampshire
Trials in England